My Mother's Eyes is an album by saxophonist Sonny Stitt recorded in 1963 in Los Angeles and released on the Pacific Jazz label.

Reception
The Allmusic site awarded the album 3 stars stating "This obscure LP finds Sonny Stitt sticking to tenor and playing a typical set filled with blues, standards and riff-filled originals".

Track listing 
All compositions by Sonny Stitt except where noted.
 "Summer Special"
 "My Mother's Eyes" (Abel Baer, L. Wolfe Gilbert) 
 "Still in Time"
 "Blue Skies" (Irving Berlin)
 "S.O.P. Blues" 
 "Don't Go to Strangers" (Redd Evans, Arthur Kent, David Mann) 
 "Red Top" (Lionel Hampton)

Personnel 
Sonny Stitt – tenor saxophone
Charles Kynard – organ  
Ray Crawford – guitar
Doug Sides – drums

References 

1963 albums
Pacific Jazz Records albums
Sonny Stitt albums